The year 1675 in science and technology involved some significant events.

Astronomy
 March 4 – John Flamsteed appointed as "astronomical observator", in effect, the first Astronomer Royal of England.
 August 10 – King Charles II of England places the foundation stone of the Royal Greenwich Observatory near London.
 Giovanni Cassini discovers the Cassini Division in the  rings of Saturn.

Exploration
 April – The Antarctic Convergence is first crossed by English merchant Anthony de la Roché, who lands on South Georgia.

Mathematics
 October 29 – German polymath Gottfried Leibniz makes the first use of the long s (∫) as a symbol of the integral in calculus.
 November 11 – Leibniz uses infinitesimal calculus for the first time to find the area under the graph of the function y=f(x).

Physiology and medicine
 Antonie van Leeuwenhoek begins to use a microscope for observing  human tissues and liquids.

Technology
 February 25 – Netherlands scientist Christiaan Huygens files drawings of his invention of the balance spring, the key component to the accuracy of portable clocks and pocket watches, in a letter to the Journal des Sçavants.

Births
 February 28 – Guillaume Delisle, French cartographer (died 1726)

Deaths
 October – James Gregory, Scottish mathematician and astronomer (born 1638)
 October 27 – Gilles de Roberval, French mathematician (born 1602)
 November 11 – Thomas Willis, English physician (born 1621)
 approx. date – John Jonston, Polish naturalist and physician (born 1603)

References

 
17th century in science
1670s in science